The Men's madison was held on 21 October 2012. 14 teams participated.

Medalists

Results
It was held at 18:17.

References

Men's madison
European Track Championships – Men's madison